John Williams (15 April 1903 – 5 May 1983) was a Tony Award-winning British stage, film, and television actor. He is remembered for his role as Chief Inspector Hubbard in Alfred Hitchcock's Dial M for Murder, as the chauffeur in Billy Wilder's Sabrina (both 1954), and as the second "Mr. French" on TV's Family Affair in its first season (1967).

Life and work
Born in Chalfont St Giles in Buckinghamshire, England, in 1903, Williams was educated at Lancing College.  He began his acting career on the English stage in 1916, appearing in J. M. Barrie's Peter Pan, Frances Nordstrom's The Ruined Lady, and Frederick Lonsdale's The Fake. 

In 1924 Williams moved to New York, where he was cast in a series of successful Broadway productions. He would appear in over 30 Broadway plays over the next four decades, performing on stage with performers such as Claudette Colbert in Clifford Grey's A Kiss in the Taxi in 1925, Helen Hayes in J. M. Barrie's Alice Sit-by-the-Fire and Gertrude Lawrence in George Bernard Shaw's Pygmalion in 1946. In 1953, Williams won a Tony Award for Actor, Supporting or Featured (Dramatic) for his role as Chief Inspector Hubbard in Frederick Knott's Dial M for Murder on Broadway. Soon afterwards, when Alfred Hitchcock adapted the play to a film version released in 1954, he cast Williams in the same role.

Williams' first appearance in a Hollywood film was in director Mack Sennett's short The Chumps (1930). He ultimately appeared in more than 40 films, including two other Hitchcock films: The Paradine Case (1947) starring Gregory Peck, in which Williams held a minor role as a barrister, and To Catch a Thief (1955) with Cary Grant and Grace Kelly, in which Williams portrayed a major character—a Lloyd's of London insurance representative. In the 1960 thriller Midnight Lace, starring Doris Day, Williams played a London police inspector much like his character in Dial M for Murder.

He also made more than 40 guest appearances on television shows.  He played in several episodes of Alfred Hitchcock Presents including: "The Long Shot" (1955), "Back for Christmas" (1956), "Whodunit" (1956), "Wet Saturday" (1956), "The Rose Garden" (1956), the three-part episode "I Killed the Count" (1957), "The Three Dreams of Mr. Findlater" (1957), and "Banquo’s Chair" (1959). Three of these episodes, "Back for Christmas", "Wet Saturday", and "Banquo’s Chair", were directed by Hitchcock himself.

Williams played William Shakespeare in The Twilight Zone episode "The Bard" (1963) and guest-starred on the sitcom My Three Sons (also 1963), portraying a stuffy, very precise English butler. In the latter role he was clean shaven, not sporting his customary mustache. Later, he was briefly part of the regular cast of the family comedy Family Affair (1967). He appeared as well on Night Gallery in the series' episode "The Doll" (1971). One of Williams' last performances was in 1979, playing alongside fellow actor Lorne Greene in a two-part episode of Battlestar Galactica titled "War of the Gods".

Williams gained notice too as the star of a frequently telecast commercial for 120 Music Masterpieces, a four-LP set of classical music excerpts from Columbia House. This became the longest-running nationally seen commercial in U.S. television history, for 13 years from 1971 to 1984.  The commercial began with a brief selection of orchestral music being played.  Williams then began the sales promotion with the following: 

In addition to his longstanding association with Hitchcock, Williams appeared in three Billy Wilder films over the course of his career: Sabrina (1954), Witness for the Prosecution (1957), and The Private Life of Sherlock Holmes (1970). In Holmes, however, his scenes were among the 60 to 75 minutes cut by the studio prior to the film's release, when the studio decided not to release it in its intended roadshow format. Williams' scenes, along with the majority of the cut material, have not been recovered.

Death
Williams died at the age of 80 on 5 May 1983, in La Jolla, California.  It was reported at the time of his death that he had been suffering from a heart condition. He was cremated, and there was no funeral.

Selected filmography

Television

 Alfred Hitchcock Presents
 "The Long Shot" (1955) – Walker Hendricks
 "Back for Christmas" (1956) – Herbert Carpenter
 "Whodunit" (1956) – Alexander Penn Arlington
 "Wet Saturday" (1956) – Capt. Smollet
 "The Rose Garden" (1956) – Alexander Vinton
 "I Killed the Count" (3-part episode, 1957) – Inspector Davidson
 "The Three Dreams of Mr. Findlater" (1957) – Ernest Findlater
 "Banquo's Chair" (1959) – Inspector Brent
 Hallmark Hall of Fame, "Dial M for Murder" (1958) – Chief Inspector Hubbard
  The Investigators, "The Oracle" (1961) – Joseph Lombard
 The Twilight Zone, "The Bard" (1963) – William Shakespeare
 The Lucy Show, "Lucy and the Great Bank Robbery" (1964) – Gordon Bentley
 Combat!, "The Furlough" (1966) – Edmund Tinsley
 Family Affair (9 episodes, 1967) – Nigel "Niles" French (Replaced Sebastian Cabot while he was recovering from an injury to his wrist)
 The Wild Wild West, "The Night of the Bleak Island" (1969) – Sir Nigel Scott
 Mission: Impossible, "Lover's Knot" (1970) – Lord Richard Weston
 Night Gallery, "The Doll" (1971) – Colonel Hymber Masters
 Night Gallery, "The Caterpillar" (1972) – Doctor 
 Columbo "Dagger of the Mind" (1972) – Sir Roger Haversham
 Battlestar Galactica, "War of the Gods" (2-part episode, 1979) – Council Member

Notes

References

External links

 
 
 
  Later (1980s) version of 120 Music Masterpieces / 30 Piano Masterpieces ad campaign, originally produced in 1971

1903 births
1983 deaths
Donaldson Award winners
English male film actors
English male stage actors
English male television actors
English expatriates in the United States
People educated at Lancing College
Tony Award winners
People from Chalfont St Giles
20th-century English male actors